The digastric muscle (also digastricus) (named digastric as it has two 'bellies') is a small muscle located under the jaw. The term "digastric muscle" refers to this specific muscle. However, other muscles that have two separate muscle bellies include the suspensory muscle of duodenum, omohyoid, occipitofrontalis.

It lies below the body of the mandible, and extends, in a curved form, from the mastoid notch to the mandibular symphysis. It belongs to the suprahyoid muscles group.

A broad aponeurotic layer is given off from the tendon of the digastric muscle on either side, to be attached to the body and greater cornu of the hyoid bone; this is termed the suprahyoid aponeurosis.

Structure
The digastricus (digastric muscle) consists of two muscular bellies united by an intermediate rounded tendon.

The two bellies of the digastric muscle have different embryological origins, and are supplied by different cranial nerves.

Each person has a right and left digastric muscle. In most anatomical discussions, the singular is used to refer to a muscle, even when each person actually has two of that muscle—one on the right side, and another on the left. For example, we speak of the deltoid, even though there is one deltoid in each shoulder. Likewise, we speak of the digastric even though there is a right and left digastric muscle.

Posterior belly
The posterior belly, longer than the anterior belly, arises from the mastoid notch which is on the inferior surface of the skull, medial to the mastoid process of the temporal bone. It lies posterior to the parotid gland and the facial nerve. The mastoid notch is a deep groove between the mastoid process and the styloid process. The mastoid notch is also referred to as the digastric groove or the digastric fossa.

The posterior belly is supplied by the digastric branch of facial nerve.

The digastric muscle stretches between the mastoid process of the cranium to the mandible at the chin, and part-way between, it becomes a tendon which passes through a tendinous pulley attached to the hyoid bone. It originates from the second pharyngeal arch.

Anterior belly
The anterior belly arises from a depression on the inner side of the lower border of the mandible called the digastric fossa of mandible, close to the symphysis, and passes downward and backward.

The anterior body is supplied by the trigeminal via the mylohyoid nerve, a branch of the inferior alveolar nerve, itself a branch of the mandibular division of the trigeminal nerve. It originates from the first pharyngeal arch.

Intermediate tendon
The two bellies end in an intermediate tendon which perforates the stylohyoideus muscle, and is held in connection with the side of the body and the greater cornu of the hyoid bone by a fibrous loop, which is sometimes lined by a mucous sheath.

Variations
Variations are numerous.

The posterior belly may arise partly or entirely from the styloid process, or be connected by a muscle slip to the middle or inferior constrictor; the anterior belly may be double, or extra slips from this belly may pass to the jaw or mylohyoideus or decussate with a similar slip on opposite side; anterior belly may be absent and posterior belly inserted into the middle of the jaw or hyoid bone.

The tendon may pass in front, more rarely behind the stylohyoideus. The mentohyoideus muscle passes from the body of hyoid bone to chin.

Triangles
The digastric muscle divides the anterior triangle of the neck into three smaller triangles. 
 (1) the submandibular triangle (also called the digastric triangle), bounded above by the lower border of the body of the mandible, and a line drawn from its angle to the sternocleidomastoideus, below by the posterior belly of the digastricus and the stylohyoideus, in front by the anterior belly of the diagastricus; 
 (2) the carotid triangle, bounded above by the posterior belly of the digastricus and stylohyoideus, behind by the sternocleidomastoideus, below by the omohyoideus; 
 (3) the suprahyoid or submental triangle, bounded laterally by the anterior belly of the digastricus, medially by the middle line of the neck from the hyoid bone to the symphysis menti, and inferiorly by the body of the hyoid bone.
 (4) The inferior carotid triangle (or muscular triangle), is bounded, in front, by the median line of the neck from the hyoid bone to the sternum; behind, by the anterior margin of the sternocleidomastoideus; above, by the superior belly of the omohyoideus

Function
The digastric muscle is involved in any complex jaw action such as speaking, swallowing, chewing and breathing.

When the digastric muscle contracts, it acts to elevate the hyoid bone.

If the hyoid is being held in place (by the infrahyoid muscles), it will tend to depress the mandible (open the mouth).

Other animals

The digastric muscles are present in a variety of animals, specific attachment sites may vary. For example, in the orangutan, the posterior digastric attaches to the mandible rather than the hyoid.

References

External links
 Frontal section
 
 
 

Muscles of the head and neck
Suprahyoid muscles